Roberto Carballés Baena was the defending champion but lost in the quarterfinals to Uladzimir Ignatik.

Gerald Melzer won the title after defeating Stefanos Tsitsipas 3–6, 6–3, 6–2 in the final.

Seeds

Draw

Finals

Top half

Bottom half

References

Main Draw
Qualifying Draw

Morocco Tennis Tour - Mohammedia - Singles
2016 Morocco Tennis Tour
Morocco Tennis Tour – Mohammedia